Route 178 is a Connecticut state highway in the northern suburbs of Hartford, running from Bloomfield to Windsor.

Route description
Route 178 begins as Loeffler Road at an intersection with Route 185 in the western part of the town of Bloomfield. The road heads generally east towards Bloomfield center, shifting to Mountain Avenue after , then intersecting with Route 189 in the town center a mile later. East of Route 189, Route 178 uses Park Avenue as it continues through the southeast part of the town. The route shifts to Wintonbury Avenue about  later using a short segment of School Street. After intersecting with Route 187, it soon enters the town of Windsor, becoming Park Avenue. The route continues east, intersecting I-91 at Exit 36 before ending at an intersection with Route 159 south of Windsor center.

History
Route 178 was commissioned in 1932, running from the intersection of School Street and Park Avenue in Bloomfield to its current eastern terminus.  In 1963, the east–west portion of former Route 184, which is mostly modern Route 178 west of School Street, was absorbed by Route 178. The west end of former Route 184 used West Street and Mountain Avenue instead of Loeffler Road. This was reconfigured to the current Loeffler Road alignment in 1965, with the former alignment becoming town roads.

Junction list

References

External links

178
Transportation in Hartford County, Connecticut